Abdel Gawad is an Egyptian surname.

Notable people with this surname include:
 Ahmed Abdel Gawad (died 2013), journalist, victim in the August 2013 Rabaa massacre
 Heba Abdel Gawad (born 1982), Egyptian swimmer
 Karim Abdel Gawad (born 1991), Egyptian squash player
 Sara Abdel Gawad (born 1982), Egyptian swimmer
 Zakaria Abdel Gawad, Egyptian novelist and journalist